Shuiche may refer to:

Shuiche, Hunan, a town in Xinhua County, Hunan, China
Shuiche, Guangdong, a town in Meixian District, Meizhou, Guangdong, China
Shuiche Township, a township in Guanyang County, Guangxi, China